Processing amplifier, commonly called ProcAmp, is used to alter, change or clean video or audio signal components or parameters in realtime.

Form factor

Broadcast professionals prefer to use hardware rack mountable ProcAmps that helps them make video broadcast safe by correcting video inconsistencies. They may also be chip-based, as part of other larger multi-purpose devices in professional environments.

Software ProcAmps are also available as code embedded in media players like Windows Media Player, VLC, KMPlayer, or in codecs like ffdshow. Software ProcAmps can process media either on the CPU or GPU.

Video ProcAmp

Video ProcAmps can be used for processing standard-definition 525/30 (NTSC) 625/25 (PAL) or high-definition video signals. ProcAmps can process video signals ranging from analog composite to SDI video signals.

Common ProcAmp Controls:

	Brightness (Luminance)
	Contrast (Gain)
	Saturation (Amplitude)
	Hue (Phase)

Common ProcAmp features:

       Regenerate sync and color burst
	Adjust sync amplitude
	Boost low light level video
	Reduce video wash out
	Chroma clipping

See also 

 Video processing
 Broadcast-safe

External links
 More information about TV standards

References

Broadcast engineering
Television technology
ITU-R recommendations